The 2023 Arab Club Champions Cup, officially named the 2023 King Salman Club Cup after Salman of Saudi Arabia, where the final tournament will be hosted, is the 30th season of the Arab Club Champions Cup, the Arab world's club football tournament organised by UAFA.

A total of 37 teams are participating in the tournament, which starts with preliminary and qualifying rounds, before the final tournament is held in Saudi Arabia in the summer of 2023 across three cities: Abha, Al-Bahah, and Taif. A total of $10 million of prize money will be awarded.

Raja CA are the defending champions, having won their second title in the previous edition.

Prize money
The prize money is as follows:
 Winners: $6,000,000
 Runners-up: $2,500,000
 Semi-finalists: $200,000
 Quarter-finalists: $150,000
 Group stage: $100,000
 Qualifying rounds: $20,000

Association team allocation 
A total of 37 teams are participating in the tournament.

On March 3, Egyptian club Al-Ahly announced its withdrawal from the competition due to scheduling issues.

Association ranking
The team entries allocation was based on the FIFA World Ranking of the associations on 22 December 2022.

Format and distribution

Teams 
The labels in the parentheses show each team's position from their last season domestic league table standing.

 
Notes

Schedule
The schedule is as follows.

Preliminary rounds

4 teams played the preliminary rounds starting with the first round then a play-off round in a one-leg knockout format. 1 team from the preliminary round advanced to the qualifying rounds.

Preliminary rounds teams
The following teams entered the preliminary rounds as lowest FIFA ranking associations. 

 Volcan Club
 Arta Solar 7 
 Horseed FC 
 Fahman

Bracket

First preliminary round

Playoff round

Qualifying rounds

24 teams were drawn into two-leg knockout stage format. 23 teams entered directly to the first qualifying round, plus one team advanced from the preliminary round. 12 teams will advance to the second qualifying round playing a two-leg knockout stage format. 6 teams only advances from the second qualifying round to the groups stage.

Seeding
The following 24 teams were divided based on their football association's FIFA Ranking.

Pot 1
 JS Saoura
 Tala'ea El-Gaish
 ASFAR
 Al-Shabab
 US Monastir
 CS Sfaxien
  
Pot 2
 Al-Quwa Al-Jawiya
 Shabab Al-Ordon
 Al-Nahda
 Al-Seeb
 Qatar SC
 Al-Wahda
  
Pot 3
 Al-Muharraq
 Manama Club
 Bourj FC
 FC Nouadhibou
 Shabab Al-Khalil
 Tishreen
 
Pot 4
 Kuwait SC
 Al-Ahli Tripoli
 Al-Ittihad Tripoli
 Al-Hilal Omdurman
 Al-Merrikh
 Fahman

Bracket

First qualifying round

The first legs will be played between 13 March and 7 April 2023, and the second legs between 21 March and 16 April 2023.

}

Notes

Second qualifying round

Group stage

16 teams were drawn into four groups of four. 10 teams already entered the group stage directly as League champions from Algeria, Egypt, Iraq, Morocco, Qatar, Saudi Arabia, and Tunisia. In addition the  previous edition holders and runners-up, and 1 invitee selected by UAFA from the host nation enters directly to the group stage. 6 teams will advance from the qualifying rounds to complete the 16-teams group stage. The winners and runners-up of each group will advance to the knockout stage.

Qualified teams
All of the qualified teams for the group stage are as follows:

Teams entered directly to the Group Stage
 CR Belouizdad
 Zamalek
 Al-Shorta
 Raja CA
 Wydad AC
 Al-Sadd
 Al-Hilal
 Al-Nassr
 Ittihad Jeddah
 Espérance de Tunis

Teams qualified from the qualifying round
 Q1
 Q2
 Q3
 Q4
 Q5
 Q6

Seeding
The following 16 teams were divided based on their football association's FIFA Ranking.

Pot 1
 Zamalek
 Raja CA
 Wydad AC
 Espérance de Tunis
  
Pot 2
 CR Belouizdad
 Al-Hilal
 Al-Nassr
 Ittihad Jeddah
  
Pot 3
 Al-Shorta
 Al-Sadd
 Q1
 Q2
 
Pot 4
 Q3
 Q4
 Q5
 Q6

Group A

Group B

Group C

Group D

Knockout stage

4 group winners and 4 runners-up from the group stage will advance to the knockout stage. Eight teams will play quarter-finals, followed by the semi-finals and the final all to be played in a single leg knockout format.

Bracket

Quarter-finals

Semi-finals

Final

Top goalscorers

Team statistics

Final tournament performance 
This table shows all team performance in the final tournament only.

Qualifications process 
This table shows teams process in the qualifications.

Broadcasting

Notes

References

External links
UAFA Official website 

2023
2023 in Asian football
2023 in African football